The Tête à Pierre Grept is a mountain in the Bernese Alps, located between the cantons of Vaud and Valais. It is situated in the region between the Grand Muveran and Pas de Cheville. On the northern side lies the small Glacier de Paneirosse.

References

External links

Tête à Pierre Grept on Hikr.org

Mountains of the Alps
Mountains of Switzerland
Mountains of the canton of Vaud
Mountains of Valais
Valais–Vaud border
Two-thousanders of Switzerland